David Ezra may refer to:

 David Alan Ezra (born 1947), U.S. district judge
 David Joseph Ezra (died 1882), merchant, property investor, and member of the Baghdadi Jewish community in Calcutta, India
 David Elias Ezra (1871–1947), member of the Baghdadi Jewish community in Calcutta, India